KS Murowana Goślina is a Polish women's volleyball club based in Murowana Goślina and plays in the women's II Liga (third division).

Previous names
Due to sponsorship, the club have competed under the following names:
 KS Murowana Goślina (2009–2010)
 KS Piecobiogaz Murowana Goślina (2010–2013)
 KS Murowana Goślina (2013–present)

History
Although only formed in 2009, the club's origin dates back to 1992 when sport classes in Murowana Goślina schools were established and in order to develop the players skills the Uczniowski Klub Sportowy "Zielone Wzgórza" (Student Sports Club "Green Hills" in English) was formed in 1994. The opportunity have a team playing in the national league came in 2009, when the city of Murowana Goślina received the right to play in the women's II Liga (third division) from club AZS AWF Poznań under an agreement signed on 6 April 2009, effectively creating . In its first season (2009–10) the club won promotion to the women's I Liga (second division). Ahead of the 2016–17 season, due to financial issues, the club entered the women's II Liga after conceding its right to play in the women's I Liga to MKS Kalisz.

Team
Season 2015–2016.

References

External links

 Official site  

Women's volleyball teams in Poland
Volleyball clubs established in 2009
2009 establishments in Poland
Sport in Greater Poland Voivodeship
Poznań County